ALD or Ald may refer to:

Medicine, science and technology 
 Adrenoleukodystrophy, a disease linked to the X chromosome
 Alcoholic liver disease
 Aldolase or ALD, an enzyme occurring naturally in animals
 Assistive listening device used to improve hearing ability 
 Atomic layer deposition, a thin-film deposition technique
Asymmetric Laplace distribution, in probability theory and statistics

Places 
 Alderley Edge railway station, Cheshire, UK (National Rail code ALD)
 Alderney, a Channel Island, Chapman code
 Alderson station, West Virginia, US (Amtrak station code ALD)
 Allahabad Junction railway station, Uttar Pradesh, India (station code ALD)
 Alerta Airport, Peru (IATA code ALD)

Politics
 Autonomy Liberty Democracy, a coalition of centre-left political parties in Aosta Valley, Italy
Arakan League for Democracy, a political party active in Rakhine State, Myanmar (Burma)

Other uses 
Ald (unit), an old Mongolian measure equal to the length between a man's outstretched arms
ALD Automotive, a French fleet managing and operational car leasing company
 Alderman, a member of a municipal assembly or council 
 Assistant lighting designer, in the theatre
 Oxford Advanced Learner's Dictionary
ALD, the Liberty dollar (private currency)

See also

Aldehyde, an organic compound
 Aldehyde dehydrogenase (ALDH), a type of enzyme
Aldolase, or Fructose-bisphosphate aldolase, an enzyme
 ALD-52, a chemical analogue of lysergic acid diethylamide (LSD)
 ALDE (disambiguation)
 Alde (disambiguation)